Temper Temper is the only album by British music act Temper Temper, consisting of Eric Gooden and singer Melanie Williams. The album was released in 1991 and contains the single "Talk Much" which peaked at No. 94 on the UK Singles Chart.

Track listing
"Talk Much"
"First Impressions"
"Like We Used To"
"Temperance"
"Don't Wanna Have to Ask You"
"Happy Days"
"It's All Outta Lovin' You"
"Stop on By"
"Sweet as Can Be"
"Beg or Plead"

Personnel
Andrew Williams – organ, vocals
Chris Manis – percussion
Doreen Edwards – background vocals
Eric Gooden – engineer, keyboards, producer, vocals, background vocals
Fritz McIntyre – organ, background vocals
Joe Roberts – vocals
Melanie Williams – vocals, background vocals
Mick Moran – percussion, producer
Nick Garside – engineer
Stephen Boyce-Buckley – string arrangements, keyboards, engineer
Sylvan Richardson – bass
Temper Temper – main performer
Tim Oliver – engineer, producer
Tony Henry – guitar
Trevor Taylor – guitar
Yvonne Shelton – background vocals

References

External links
 Temper Temper at Discogs

1991 debut albums
Virgin Records albums